Hyarias is a monotypic tiger moth genus in the family Erebidae erected by Charles Swinhoe in 1892. Its only species, Hyarias metarhoda, was described by Francis Walker in 1856. It is strictly endemic to the Philippines.

Taxonomy
This species was previously included in Spilosoma, but those species have quite different male genitalia.

References

External links

Spilosomina
Monotypic moth genera
Moths of Asia